Martinson is an English surname of Scandinavian origin. Notable people with the surname include:

Allan Martinson, Estonian venture capitalist
Connie Martinson, American writer and television personality
Edwin Joseph Martinson, American politician
Gloria Martinson, American philanthropist
Harry Martinson, Swedish sailor, author, and poet
Leslie H. Martinson, American television and film director
Moa Martinson, Swedish author
Sergey Martinson, Russian eccentric comic actor
Steve Martinson, American hockey player

See also
Maris Martinsons, director of the Pacific Rim Institute for the Studies of Management and professor of management
Māris Martinsons (director)
Martinson's Beach, Saskatchewan, Canada